Fimbristylis acuminata, commonly known as pointed fimbristylis, is a sedge of the family Cyperaceae that is found in tropical areas extending from India, through parts of South East Asia and into northern Australia.

It blooms between May and August and produces brown flowers.

In Western Australia it is found along creeks and in other damp areas in the Kimberley region where it grows in muddy-loamy soils.

References

Plants described in 1805
Flora of Western Australia
acuminata